Jennifer Dickson  (born 17 September 1936) is a South African-born British photographer. She studied at Goldsmiths College in England and Atelier 17 in France. Since 1969 she has lived in Canada.

Early life and education
Jennifer Dickson was born in Piet Retief in Mpumalanga province in South Africa on 17 September 1936. From 1954 to 1959, she studied painting and printmaking at the Goldsmiths College School of Art at the University of London in England. From 1960 to 1965, she was the apprentice of Stanley William Hayter at Atelier 17 in Paris, France. During this time, in 1962, she held her first solo exhibition in London.

After her apprenticeship, she began teaching at the Brighton College of Art in Brighton, England. She put in place a graduate program in printmaking at this college, including photography.

In 1968, she moved to Jamaica to become a visiting fellow in fine and applied arts at the University of the West Indies.

Career in Canada
In 1969, Dickson emigrated to Canada where she became the director of the graphics program at the Saidye Bronfman Centre in Montreal, Quebec. Dickson was elected as a Royal Academician in 1976. She currently lives in Ottawa, Ontario, Canada.  A lecturer and former faculty member at the University of Ottawa, Dickson has given many talks on the evolution of garden aesthetics and how this intersects with cultural practices.

Collections
Her work is included in the collections of the Musée national des beaux-arts du Québec and the National Gallery of Canada

Honours
In 1995, she was made a Member of the Order of Canada.

References

External links

 Official website
 Dickson in the Canadian Encyclopedia
 Dickson biography, National Gallery of Canada
 
 

1936 births
Living people
Members of the Order of Canada
Royal Academicians
20th-century British women artists
Alumni of Goldsmiths, University of London
Atelier 17 alumni
British women photographers